Grovespring is an unincorporated community in Wright County, Missouri, United States.

A post office called Grovespring was established in 1872, and the name was changed to Grovespring in 1895.

Demographics

References

Unincorporated communities in Wright County, Missouri
Unincorporated communities in Missouri